Pietro Catena (1501 – 1576) was an Italian astronomer, philosopher, mathematician, theologian and catholic priest, citizen of the Republic of Venice. He was a precursor of the Renaissance scientific revolution and investigated on the relationships between mathematics, logic and philosophy. As a professor in Padua, Catena occupied the same mathematical chair later assigned to Galileo Galilei.

Life 

A catholic priest born in Venice in 1501, Pietro Catena was well known as a philosopher and mathematician, and also considered excellent in Greek and Latin. He was a public lecturer of Metaphysics and professor of mathematics at the University of Padua from 1548 to 1576, where Giuseppe Moleti and later Galileo Galilei succeeded him.

Catena published in 1556 in Venice Universa loca in logica Aristotelis in mathematicas disciplinas, the collection of pieces from the Aristotelian works that recognized the prevailing speculative character of mathematical knowledge, a theme to which he also devoted another work.

Works

References 

16th-century Italian astronomers
16th-century Italian mathematicians
Italian philosophers
Italian theologians
16th-century Italian Roman Catholic priests
1501 births
1577 deaths
Scientists from Venice
16th-century Venetian people